is a 2002 Japanese drama film directed by Akihiko Shiota and starring Aoi Miyazaki.

Cast
 Aoi Miyazaki as Sachiko Kita
 Seiichi Tanabe as Ogata
 Tetsu Sawaki as Takao
 Ryo Amamiya as Tokugawa
 Koji Ishikawa as Kyuzo
 Yū Aoi as Natsuko
 Ryo as Toshiko Kita
 Eihi Shiina as Mano
 Yusuke Iseya
 Susumu Terajima
 Ken Mitsuishi
 Masahiro Toda
 Nao Omori
 Alexandra Delvillar

Awards
27th Hochi Film Award
 Best Actor - Seiichi Tanabe
24th Yokohama Film Festival
9th Best Film

References

External links
  
 

2002 films
Films directed by Akihiko Shiota
Japanese drama films
Films about dysfunctional families
2000s Japanese films